Release is the eighth studio album by English synth-pop duo Pet Shop Boys, released on 1 April 2002 by Parlophone.



Background
After the release of their previous studio album, Nightlife (1999), Pet Shop Boys originally planned to release a greatest hits collection in the autumn of 2000 with the two new tracks "Positive Role Model" and "Somebody Else's Business". While recording the new songs for the hits collection, it was decided to produce a full-length studio album instead.

The album reached number seven in the United Kingdom and number three in Germany. On its first release, a limited run of metallic effect embossed sleeves were available in a choice of four colours: grey, blue, pink or red. In the US, this limited run also came with a bonus CD including remixes and new tracks. The artwork was designed by Greg Foley of the New York design group and magazine publishers Visionaire and was nominated for a Grammy Award for Best Recording Package.

The album marked a significant departure from previous work, being guitar- and piano-driven. However, the album was made like their previous albums with most tracks mainly programmed on computers; however, the sampled or synthesised guitars and drum sounds chosen often sound "real" and the synthesisers always present are sometimes used to sound like guitars (the solo in "Birthday Boy", for instance, or the opening figure of "Home and Dry"). Ex-Smiths guitarist Johnny Marr was brought in later on in the sessions to play real electric and acoustic guitars on seven of the album's ten tracks in London, with "Home and Dry" being completed in Dublin, Ireland. Apart from the track "London", recorded in Berlin with producer Chris Zippel, Pet Shop Boys produced the album themselves and then commissioned Michael Brauer to mix it.

The original version of the album had eleven tracks but "I Didn't Get Where I Am Today" was removed from the album before release and later became a bonus track on the 2004 single "Flamboyant". Other tracks recorded during the sessions for the album which ended up as B-sides are "Between Two Islands", "Searching for the Face of Jesus", "Sexy Northerner" and "Always". Another track, "Time on My Hands", appeared on the 2003 release, Disco 3.

The directors for all three music videos for the album's singles are photographers by trade: Wolfgang Tillmans directed "Home and Dry", Bruce Weber directed "I Get Along" (following his previous work on the "Being Boring" and "Se a vida é" videos), and Martin Parr directed "London". The Tillmans video, consisting almost entirely of footage of mice filmed at Tottenham Court Road tube station in the London Underground, is considered by some to have significantly undermined the commercial potential of the lead single, due to being deemed nearly unplayable by MTV and other music video channels.

Perhaps partly because of the modest commercial success of this album, and perhaps partly because of the habit of distancing themselves musically from their most recent work, Tennant and Lowe have since returned to their dance roots. One year after the release of Release, Pet Shop Boys released Disco 3 which included remixes of some of the songs from Release along with new material that they were working on at the time of writing and producing material for Release.

The album re-entered the UK Albums Chart at number 30 in August 2017 following the Release/Further Listening 2001–2004 reissue.

Track listing

Notes
  signifies a remixer
  signifies an additional producer

Sample credits
 "Birthday Boy" features a sample from the Choir of Clare College, Cambridge performing "In the Bleak Midwinter", written by Harold Darke and Christina Rossetti.
 "Between Two Islands" contains an excerpt of "I Want You", written by Leon Ware and T-Boy Ross.
 "I Didn't Get Where I Am Today" includes a sample from "Father's Name Is Dad", written by Dave Lambert and performed by Fire.

Personnel
Credits adapted from the liner notes of Release.

Pet Shop Boys
 Neil Tennant – vocals, guitar, keyboards
 Chris Lowe – keyboards, drum programming

Additional musicians
 Pete Gleadall – programming 
 Johnny Marr – guitars 
 Jody Linscott – percussion 
 Steve Walters – bass guitar 
 Chris Zippel – keyboards ; spoken idea 
 "Little Mike" – guitar, bass 
 Richard Niles – string arrangement, string conducting

Technical
 Pet Shop Boys – production 
 Pete Gleadall – engineering 
 Michael Brauer – mixing
 Rick Chavarria – mix assistance
 Chris Zippel – production, engineering 
 Kai Diener – premix 
 Florian Richter – premix 
 Mike Ross – string recording 
 Andrew Nichols – recording assistance at Sony Music Studios
 Philippe Rose – mixing assistance
 Greg Calbi – mastering
 Steve Fallone – mastering assistance

Artwork
 Dan Forbes – photography
 Pennie Smith – portrait
 Greg Foley – art direction
 Jake McCabe – design production
 Tatiana Gaz – design associate

Charts

Weekly charts

Year-end charts

Certifications and sales

Notes

References

2002 albums
Parlophone albums
Pet Shop Boys albums